Kinosternoidea is a superfamily of aquatic turtles, which includes two families: Dermatemydidae, and Kinosternidae.

Kinosternoids are cryptodires, turtles whose necks are able to retract within their shell. Molecular studies suggest they are likely the sister group to the snapping turtles of the family Chelydridae. They are also omnivorous, oviparous, phosphatic, and actively mobile.

Classification

Family Dermatemydidae
Genus Dermatemys
Genus Baptemys

Family Kinosternidae
Genus Hoplochelys
Subfamily Staurotypinae
Genus Claudius
Genus Staurotypus
Subfamily Kinosterninae
Genus Kinosternon
Genus Sternotherus

Past classification
The entirely unrelated big-headed turtle (Platysternon megacephalum) was previously included in classification.

References

Bibliography